Pachnoda sinuata flaviventris, the garden fruit chafer,  is a subspecies of beetle belonging to the family Scarabaeidae.

Description
Elytra are usually yellow or red, with a complex black pattern of markings. This subspecies shows a great variability of habitus. It is very similar to Pachnoda trimaculata. It can be distinguished on the basis of the analysis of the reproductive system of the  male.

These beetles are diurnal. Adults feed on fruits, while larvae feed on humus and fruits.

Distribution
This subspecies can be found in Democratic Republic of the Congo, Uganda, Tanzania, Zambia, Ethiopia and South Africa.

References

Cetoniinae
Beetles of Africa
Beetles described in 1833